Belturbet is a town in County Cavan, Ireland.

History 
Belturbet's location is historically one of the best places for crossing the River Erne. It was the capital of the Kingdom of East Breifne which was an historic kingdom of Ireland roughly corresponding to County Cavan that existed from 1256 to 1607. When the Anglo-Normans tried to conquer Cavan in the early 13th century, Walter de Lacy built a motte-and-bailey on Turbet Island. The fort was probably made of wood and has not survived, although the steep mound of earth where it was built can still be seen. In the late 16th century the local O'Reilly chieftains built a castle opposite Turbot Island, but this has not survived either.

As part of the Plantation of Ulster in the early 17th century, the lands around Belturbet were granted to the English "undertaker" Stephen Butler. He soon established a thriving urban centre, whose prosperity relied heavily on its position on the Erne. The town was seized by the Irish during the Irish Rebellion of 1641, and was the site of one of the massacres of planters, in which over two dozen people were thrown from the town's bridge and drowned. In March 1653, under Viscount Magennis of Iveagh, it was the last town in Ireland to fall to Cromwell; the final Irish stronghold at nearby Cloughoughter held out for a further month.

The town also acquired an English garrison in the late 17th century. Many of the original fortifications are in good repair. Belturbet retains much of its original layout. The main street leads to the square or 'diamond' where all of the town's important buildings are situated. The Church of Ireland church dominates the skyline; some of it dates from the early 17th century, and it was one of the first Anglican churches built in Ireland, reputedly using materials from Drumlane Abbey. The proto-Quaker leader, William Edmundson, was detained in Belturbet in the 1650s, and put in the stocks. The church was damaged by lightning in the 1720s.

Belturbet was represented in the Irish House of Commons from 1611 to 1800. It was a rotten borough in the control of the Earl of Lanesborough. under the Penal Laws, between 1725 and 1793 Catholics and those married to Catholics could not vote.

John Wesley passed through in 1760, and noted

Two young people, Geraldine O'Reilly, from Staghall, Belturbet, and Patrick Stanley, from Clara, County Offaly, were killed by a Loyalist car bomb in Belturbet on 28 December 1972.

Education
The town has three primary schools, including St. Mary's BNS (a male primary school for second class up to sixth class), Fairgreen National School (a mixed-gender Church of Ireland school, and Covent of Mercy National School (educating boys up to first class and girls up to sixth class).

The town's only secondary school is St Bricins Vocational School, a vocational school run by County Cavan VEC.

Transport

Rail transport
The railway station in Belturbet has recently been restored and is back to its former glory. It was opened on 29 June 1885 for the Great Northern Railway (Ireland) connecting to the broad gauge branch to Ballyhaise railway station on the Clones to Cavan line. It also served the narrow gauge Cavan and Leitrim Railway to Dromod and Arigna, for which it opened on 24 October 1887. The station finally closed for all services on 1 April 1959.

Belturbet railway station is a railway museum.

Coach/ bus transport
Bus Éireann Expressway Route 30, jointly operated with McGeehan Coaches. This bus route links Dublin with Donegal providing several stops per day. This bus runs several times daily. Also, Ulsterbus Route 58 from Enniskillen has its terminus in the town. The bus stop is located outside the former post office on the Diamond (for Cavan/Dublin-bound services it is on the opposite side of the road). Leydons Coaches operate route 930 linking the town to Cavan, Ballyconnell, Bawnboy, Swanlinbar and Enniskillen.

Roads
The Staghall to Drumaloor section of the N3 Belturbet Bypass opened on 2 August 2013.
The remainder to the south opened on 13 December 2013.

Economy 
Economic contributors to the town include its retail, service and tourist industries. There is a business park to the north east of the town and smaller employers within the town itself. Tourism facilities include fishing, boat cruising, the local railway station and country walks. The town has its own festival, Belturbet Festival Of The Erne, which also includes the Lady Of the Erne competition. Employment for most of the locals is in Cavan town, Ballyconnell or other nearby areas. The town has a farmers mart every Friday afternoon.

Sport
Belturbet has a local GAA club, Belturbet Rory O'Moores.

Arts
The Erne Palais Ballroom is one of the buildings in the town listed by the National Inventory of Architectural Heritage.

From 1893 to 1931, Shan Fadh Bullock wrote 14 novels set in the Cavan-Fermanagh borderland, renaming Belturbet "Bunn" for his books. Belturbet is also mentioned in James Joyce's 1922 novel Ulysses, in the fifteenth episode, Circe. The reference comes from Cissy Caffrey, who says: 'More luck to me. Cavan, Cootehill and Belturbet'.

Notable people
 Brendan Perry (b.1959), composer and singer with Dead Can Dance, lives in the vicinity of the town.
 James Somers (1894–1918), soldier who won the Victoria Cross during the First World War was from Belturbet.
 Andrew Grene (1965–2010), a civil affairs officer with the United Nations, grew up largely on a small farm outside Belturbet. He was killed in the Haiti earthquake of January 12, 2010, and was laid to rest in Belturbet churchyard.
 Séamus Fitzpatrick, financier and founder of CapVest Limited hails from the town

See also
 List of towns and villages in Ireland

References

External links

 A map Of Belturbet Town
 Belturbet Town 1613-1840

Towns and villages in County Cavan